Brigham Morris Young (–) was one of the founders of the Young Men's Mutual Improvement Association (YMMIA), the predecessor to the Young Men program of the Church of Jesus Christ of Latter-day Saints (LDS Church).

Young was the son of Brigham Young and one of his wives, Margaret Pierce. In 1875, Morris Young served a mission for the LDS Church in the Hawaiian Islands. Shortly after returning from this mission, he was asked by his father to organize the YMMIA along with Junius F. Wells and Milton H. Hardy.

In 1883, Young served another mission in the Hawaiian Islands.  He married Armeda Snow, a daughter of Lorenzo Snow. Their son, Lorenzo Snow Young, was a prominent architect in Utah.

In 1885, Young, his wife, and their children returned from serving his second mission in the Hawaiian Islands. Shortly after returning to Utah, Young began publicly performing as a cross-dressing singer under the pseudonym Madam Pattirini. Young performed as Pattirini in north and central Utah venues from 1885 to the 1900s. He could produce a convincing falsetto, and many in the audience did not realize that Pattirini was Young. One of his performances as Madam Pattirini was for the last birthday celebration of LDS Church president Lorenzo Snow in April 1901. He also once portrayed a "fine Irish girl" named Bridget McCarthy at a Christmas ball at the Salt Lake Theatre in 1886.

See also
Descendants of Brigham Young

Sources
Andrew Jenson. LDS Biographical Encyclopedia. Vol. 4, p. 251.
Galen Snow Young. Brief History of Brigham Morris Young. P. 31.
Dean C. Jessee. Letters from Brigham Young to His Sons. P. 243.

References

External links

Brief history of Brigham Morris Young, MSS SC 1999 at L. Tom Perry Special Collections, Harold B. Lee Library, Brigham Young University

1854 births
1931 deaths
19th-century American singers
20th-century American singers
19th-century Mormon missionaries
American drag queens
American leaders of the Church of Jesus Christ of Latter-day Saints
American Mormon missionaries
Mormon missionaries in Hawaii
Richards–Young family
Young Men (organization) people
Burials at Salt Lake City Cemetery
American expatriates in the Hawaiian Kingdom
Cross-dressers
Male-to-female cross-dressers
Female impersonators
Latter Day Saints from Utah
Children of Brigham Young
Singers from Utah
People of the American Old West